The Apostolic Nunciature to Eritrea is an ecclesiastical office of the Catholic Church in Eritrea. It is a diplomatic post of the Holy See, whose representative is called the Apostolic Nuncio with the rank of an ambassador. The Nuncio resides in Sudan and usually holds the title Apostolic Nuncio to Sudan as well.

Since 31 March 2020, the position of Apostolic Nuncio to both Sudan and Eritrea has been held by Archbishop Luis Miguel Munoz Cardaba of Spain.

List of Apostolic Nuncios
Silvano Maria Tomasi (27 June 1996 - 10 June 2003)
Dominique Mamberti (19 February 2004 - 15 September 2006)
Leo Boccardi (30 January 2007  - 11 July 2013)
Hubertus van Megen (7 June 2014 - 16 February 2019)
Luís Miguel Muñoz Cárdaba (31 March 2020 – present)

References

 
Eritrea